Alexander Friedrich von Hueck (7 December 1802 – 28 July 1842) was a Baltic-German professor of anatomy at the University of Tartu, and a notable estophile.

Life and work
Von Hueck was born in Reval (Tallinn), in the Kreis Harrien of the Governorate of Estonia (present-day Estonia). He studied medicine at the University of Dorpat (Tartu) from 1821 to 1825, receiving the Gold Medallion in 1823; and later also in Berlin and Heidelberg. In 1830, he was made professor of anatomy at the University of Dorpat (now U of Tartu), becoming Dean of Medicine in 1835, renewed in 1840. In 1838, he conducted a scientific travel through Livonia with the aim of studying pre-historical animals. He died in Dorpat Tartu on 28 July in 1842.

Among his contributions to his scientific field, were observational studies within eye movement.

He was a founding member of the student organization 'Estonia', established in Dorpat (Tartu) in 1821.

He was one of the founding members in 1838 and from 1842 its president, of the estophile Learned Estonian Society in Tartu.

References

 4. Deutsch-Baltisches Biographisches Lexikon (1710-1960): https://bbld.de

1802 births
1842 deaths
People from Tallinn
People from Kreis Harrien
Baltic-German people
Estophiles
University of Tartu alumni
Academic staff of the University of Tartu